Brétigny is a village in the commune of Sours, near Chartres, in Eure-et-Loir department, France. It is notable as the place in which the 1360 Treaty of Brétigny was signed, which ended the first phase of the Hundred Years' War.

Villages in Centre-Val de Loire